Lunar soil is the fine fraction of the regolith found on the surface of the Moon. Its properties can differ significantly from those of terrestrial soil. The physical properties of lunar soil are primarily the result of mechanical disintegration of basaltic and anorthositic rock, caused by continual meteoric impacts and bombardment by solar and interstellar charged atomic particles over billions of years. The process is largely one of mechanical weathering in which the particles are ground to progressively finer size over time. This situation contrasts fundamentally to terrestrial dirt formation, mediated by the presence of molecular oxygen (O2), humidity, atmospheric wind, and a robust array of contributing biological processes.

Lunar soil typically refers to only the finer fraction of lunar regolith, which is composed of grains 1 cm in diameter or less, but is often used interchangeably. Lunar dust generally connotes even finer materials than lunar soil. There is no official definition as to what size fraction constitutes "dust"; some place the cutoff at less than 50 μm in diameter, while others put it at less than 10 μm.

Formation processes

The major processes involved in the formation of lunar soil are:
Comminution: mechanical breaking of rocks and minerals into smaller particles by meteorite and micrometeorite impacts;
Agglutination: welding of mineral and rock fragments together by micrometeorite-impact-produced glass;
Solar wind sputtering and cosmic ray spallation caused by impacts of ions and high energy particles.

These processes continue to change the physical and optical properties of the dirt over time, and it is known as space weathering.

In addition, fire fountaining, whereby volcanic lava is lofted and cools into small glass beads before falling back to the surface, can create small but important deposits in some locations, such as the orange dirt found at Shorty Crater in the Taurus-Littrow valley by Apollo 17, and the green glass found at Hadley-Apennine by Apollo 15. Deposits of volcanic beads are also thought to be the origin of Dark Mantle Deposits (DMD) in other locations around the Moon.

Mineralogy and composition

Lunar soil is composed of various types of particles including rock fragments, mono-mineralic fragments, and various kinds of glasses including agglutinate particles, volcanic and impact spherules. The agglutinates form at the lunar surface by micrometeorite impacts that cause small-scale melting which fuses adjacent materials together with tiny specks of elemental iron embedded in each dust particle's glassy shell. Over time, material is mixed both vertically and horizontally (a process known as "gardening") by impact processes. The contribution of material from external sources is relatively minor, such that the dirt composition at any given location largely reflects the local bedrock composition.

There are two profound differences in the chemistry of lunar regolith and dirt from terrestrial materials. The first is that the Moon is very dry.  As a result, those minerals with water as part of their structure (mineral hydration) such as clay, mica, and amphiboles are absent from the Moon's surface. The second difference is that lunar regolith and crust are chemically reduced, rather than being significantly oxidized like the Earth's crust. In the case of the regolith, this is due in part to the constant bombardment of the lunar surface with protons from the solar wind. One consequence is that iron on the Moon is found in the elemental (0) and cationic (+2) oxidation states, whereas on Earth iron is found primarily in the +2 and +3 oxidation states.

The differences between Earth's soil and lunar soil mean that plants struggle to grow in it.  As a result, colonization of the Moon and other long-term space missions could require complicated and expensive efforts to provide food, such as importing Earth soil, chemically treating lunar soil to remove heavy metals and oxidize iron atoms, and selectively breeding strains of plants that are adapted to the inhospitable lunar regolith.

Properties

The significance of acquiring appropriate knowledge of lunar soil properties is great. The potential for construction of structures, ground transportation networks, and waste disposal systems, to name a few examples, will depend on real-world experimental data obtained from testing lunar soil samples. The load-carrying capability of the dirt is an important parameter in the design of such structures on Earth.

Due to myriad meteorite impacts (with speeds in the range of 20 km/s), lunar surface is covered with a thin layer of dust. The dust is electrically charged and sticks to any surface with which it comes in contact.

Density of lunar regolith is about 1.5 g/cm3.  Dirt becomes very dense beneath the top layer of regolith.

Other factors which may affect the properties of lunar soil include large temperature differentials, the presence of a hard vacuum, and the absence of a significant lunar magnetic field, thereby allowing charged solar wind particles to continuously hit the surface of the Moon.

Moon dust fountains and electrostatic levitation
There is some evidence that the Moon has a tenuous layer of moving dust particles constantly leaping up from and falling back to the Moon's surface, giving rise to a "dust atmosphere" that looks static but is composed of dust particles in constant motion. The term "Moon fountain" has been used to describe this effect by analogy with the stream of molecules of water in a fountain following a ballistic trajectory while appearing static due to the constancy of the stream. According to a model proposed in 2005 by the Laboratory for Extraterrestrial Physics at NASA's Goddard Space Flight Center, this is caused by electrostatic levitation. On the daylit side of the Moon, solar hard ultraviolet and X-ray radiation is energetic enough to knock electrons out of atoms and molecules in the lunar soil. Positive charges build up until the tiniest particles of lunar dust (measuring 1 micrometre and smaller) are repelled from the surface and lofted anywhere from metres to kilometres high, with the smallest particles reaching the highest altitudes. Eventually they fall back toward the surface where the process is repeated. On the night side, the dust is negatively charged by electrons from the solar wind. Indeed, the fountain model suggests that the night side would achieve greater electrical tension differences than the day side, possibly launching dust particles to even higher altitudes. This effect could be further enhanced during the portion of the Moon's orbit where it passes through Earth's magnetotail, part of the magnetic field of the Moon. On the terminator there could be significant horizontal electric fields forming between the day and night areas, resulting in horizontal dust transport - a form of "Moon storm".

This effect was anticipated in 1956 by science fiction author Hal Clement in his short story "Dust Rag", published in Astounding Science Fiction.

There is some evidence for this effect. In the early 1960s, Surveyor 7 and several prior Surveyor spacecraft that soft-landed on the Moon returned photographs showing an unmistakable twilight glow low over the lunar horizon persisting after the Sun had set. Moreover, contrary to the expectation of airless conditions with no atmospheric haze, the distant horizon between land and sky did not look razor-sharp. Apollo 17 astronauts orbiting the Moon in 1972 repeatedly saw and sketched what they variously called "bands," "streamers" or "twilight rays" for about 10 seconds before lunar sunrise or lunar sunset. Such rays were also reported by astronauts aboard Apollo 8, 10, and 15. These might have been similar to crepuscular rays on Earth.

Apollo 17 also placed an experiment on the Moon's surface called LEAM, short for Lunar Ejecta and Meteorites. It was designed to look for dust kicked up by small meteoroids hitting the Moon's surface. It had three sensors that could record the speed, energy, and direction of tiny particles: one each pointing up, east, and west. LEAM saw a large number of particles every morning, mostly coming from the east or west—rather than above or below—and mostly slower than speeds expected for lunar ejecta. In addition, the experiment's temperature increased to near 100 degrees Celsius a few hours after each lunar sunrise, so the unit had to be turned off temporarily because it was overheating. It is speculated that this could have been a result of electrically charged moondust sticking to LEAM, darkening its surface so the experiment package absorbed rather than reflected sunlight. However, scientists were unable to make a definite determination of the source of the problem, as LEAM operated only briefly before the Apollo program ended.

It is possible that these storms have been spotted from Earth: For centuries, there have been reports of strange glowing lights on the Moon, known as "Transient lunar phenomena" or TLPs. Some TLPs have been observed as momentary flashes, now generally accepted to be visible evidence of meteoroids impacting the lunar surface. But others have appeared as amorphous reddish or whitish glows or even as dusky hazy regions that change shape or disappear over seconds or minutes. These may have been a result of sunlight reflecting from suspended lunar dust.

Harmful effects of lunar dust
A 2005 NASA study listed 20 risks that required further study before humans should commit to a human Mars expedition, and ranked "dust" as the number one challenge. The report urged study of its mechanical properties, corrosiveness, grittiness, and effect on electrical systems. Most scientists think the only way to answer the questions definitively is by returning samples of Martian dirt and rock to Earth well before launching any astronauts.

Although that report addressed Martian dust, the concerns are equally valid concerning lunar dust. The dust found on the lunar surface could cause harmful effects on any human outpost technology and crew members:
 Darkening of surfaces, leading to a considerable increase in radiative heat transfer;
 Abrasive nature of the dust particles may rub and abrade surfaces through friction;
 Negative effect on coatings used on gaskets to seal equipment from space, optical lenses, solar panels, and windows as well as wiring;
 Possible damage to an astronaut's lungs, nervous, and cardiovascular systems;
 Possible increased risk of spacesuit arcing due to small dust grains' exposure to the space environment.

The principles of astronautical hygiene should be used to assess the risks of exposure to lunar dust during exploration on the Moon's surface and thereby determine the most appropriate measures to control exposure. These may include removing the spacesuit in a three-stage airlock, "vacuuming" the suit with a magnet before removal, and using local exhaust ventilation with a high-efficiency particulate filter to remove dust from the spacecraft's atmosphere.

The harmful properties of lunar dust are not well known. Based on studies of dust found on Earth, it is expected that exposure to lunar dust will result in greater risks to health both from acute and chronic exposure. This is because lunar dust is more chemically reactive and has larger surface areas composed of sharper jagged edges than Earth dust. If the chemical reactive particles are deposited in the lungs, they may cause respiratory disease. Long-term exposure to the dust may cause a more serious respiratory disease similar to silicosis. During lunar exploration the astronauts' spacesuits will become contaminated with lunar dust. The dust will be released into the atmosphere when the suits are removed. The methods used to mitigate exposure will include providing high air recirculation rates in the airlock, the use of a "Double Shell Spacesuit", the use of dust shields, the use of high–grade magnetic separation, and the use of solar flux to sinter and melt the regolith.

Present availability

Although this material has been isolated in vacuum-packed bottles, it is now unusable for detailed chemical or mechanical analysis—the gritty particles deteriorated the knife-edge indium seals of the vacuum bottles; air has slowly leaked in. Every sample brought back from the Moon has been contaminated by Earth's air and humidity. The dust has acquired a patina of rust, and, as a result of bonding with terrestrial water and oxygen molecules, its chemical reactivity is gone. The chemical and electrostatic properties of the dirt no longer match what future astronauts will encounter on the Moon.

Moon dust-contaminated items finally became available to the public in 2014, when the US government approved the sale of private material owned, and collected, by astronauts. Since then only one item has been produced for sale with genuine Moon dust collected after the item spent over 32 hours on the Moon. A luggage strap, exposed to the elements of the Moon for 32 hours, a piece of Charles "Pete" Conrad's spacesuit on the Apollo 12 mission, was sold by his estate to a private purchaser at auction. In 2017 lunar soil collected by Neil Armstrong in 1969 was put up for auction. While many jewelry- and watch-makers claim their product contains "Moon dust", the products only contain pieces of, or dust from, meteorites believed to have originated from the Moon. On 11 September 2020, NASA announced that it is willing to create a market for lunar soil by calling for proposals to purchase it from commercial suppliers. In May 2022, scientists successfully grew plants using lunar soil. Thale cress (Arabidopsis thaliana) was the first plant to have sprouted and grown on Earth in soil from another celestial body.

Chang'e-5 Project

On 16 December 2020, China's Chang'e 5 mission returned to Earth with a cargo of about 2 kilograms of rock and dirt it picked up from the Moon. It is the first sample of lunar regolith to come back to Earth since 1976. China is the third country in the world that has brought such material back to Earth.

Chang'e-5 is part of the first phase of the Chinese Lunar Exploration Program. There are still 3 projects left in this phase of the program (Chang'e-6 in 2024, Chang'e-7 in 2024 and Chang'e-8 in 2027). The second phase of the program is to land Chinese astronauts on the Moon between 2030 and 2039.

See also

Lunar regolith simulant
Lunar resources
Moon rock
Sodium tail of the Moon

References

External links

Geotechnical Properties of Lunar Soil
Parameters of Lunar Soils Lunar and Planetary Institute
Discovered After 40 Years: Moon Dust Hazard Influenced By Sun's Elevation

Lunar science
Soil
Articles containing video clips
Regolith